"L'Americano" is a song performed by five piece band The Gypsy Queens, featuring The Boys from Made in Chelsea, released on December 13, 2012 as a digital download in the United Kingdom on iTunes, peaking to number 53 on the UK Singles Chart. The song also features on their debut album The Gypsy Queens (2012) featuring vocals from Madeleine Peyroux. It is a cover of Renato Carosone's 1956 song "Tu Vuò Fà L'Americano".

Music video
A music video to accompany the release of "L'Americano" was first released onto YouTube on October 31, 2012 at a total length of two minutes and fifteen seconds. A second music video was uploaded to YouTube on December 19, 2012.

Sound Tracks
In 2022, their single "L'Americano" was featured in the Netflix Movie "Love in the villa".

Track listing

Chart performance

Release history

References

2012 singles
The Gypsy Queens songs
2012 songs
London Records singles